The II Games of the Small States of Europe were held in the Principality of Monaco.

Competitions

Medal count

Final Table:

References

San Marino Olympic Committee 

 
Games of the Small States of Europe
Games of the Small States of Europe
Games of the Small States of Europe
International sports competitions hosted by Monaco
Games of the Small States of Europe
Multi-sport events in Monaco
Games of the Small States of Europe